Monty Hall  (born Monte Halparin; August 25, 1921 – September 30, 2017) was a Canadian radio and television show host who moved to the United States in 1955 to pursue a career in broadcasting. After working as a radio newsreader and sportscaster, Hall returned to television in the U.S., this time in game shows. Starting in 1963, he was best known as the game show host and producer of Let's Make a Deal. As a celebrity, he had a conundrum with game theory and psychology aspects named after him: the Monty Hall problem. Behind the scenes, Hall also carried on an active life of philanthropy.

Early life

Hall was born as Monte Halparin in Winnipeg, Manitoba, on August 25, 1921, to Orthodox Jewish parents Maurice Harvey Halparin, who owned a slaughterhouse, and Rose (née Rusen). He was raised in Winnipeg's north end, where he attended Lord Selkirk School (Elmwood, Winnipeg), and, later St. John's High School. Hall graduated with a Bachelor of Science degree from the University of Manitoba, where he majored in chemistry and zoology. He was sponsored through university by Max Freed, a local businessman who was a customer of his father. Originally though, Hall had hoped to go to medical school but was not admitted due to secret quotas restricting the number of Jewish students admitted.

Career
Hall's first radio job was working for CKRC radio in Winnipeg while still a student. He briefly worked for the Canadian Wheat Board after graduating before deciding to pursue a full-time career in broadcasting. He moved to Toronto in 1946 and found a job with radio station CHUM, where management shortened his name to Hall and misspelled his first name as "Monty" on billboards, giving him the stage name "Monty Hall". For the next decade he hosted and produced a number of programs for radio stations in Toronto, as well as Who Am I? on CFRB, which was distributed nationally in Canada through private syndication until 1959. He also had several short-lived programmes on CBC Television after it was launched in 1952, but when they were cancelled and another program he had conceived of was taken away from him, Hall decided he had no future in Canadian television.

Hall moved to New York City in 1955, attempting to break into American broadcasting, but commuted to Toronto several times a month to record episode blocks of Who Am I? In New York, Hall hosted game shows such as Bingo at Home on WABD-TV and guest-hosted more established game shows such as Strike It Rich on CBS and Twenty-One on NBC. He was the host/performer of two local New York City TV film shows for children, Cowboy Theater for WRCA (Channel 4) in 1956 and Fun In the Morning for WNEW (Ch. 5) in the early 1960s. From 1956 to 1960, along with NBC Radio newsman Morgan Beatty, Hall co-hosted the Saturday night segment of the NBC Radio Network weekend program Monitor from 8 p.m. until midnight (EST). At least two recordings of Hall on Monitor are known to exist.

Hall was a radio analyst for the New York Rangers of the National Hockey League during the 1959–1960 season.

He succeeded Jack Narz as host of a game show called Video Village, which ran from 1960 to 1962 on CBS. From 1961 to 1962, Hall hosted its spinoff, Video Village Junior, which featured children. After moving to Southern California, Hall became the host of the game show Let's Make a Deal, which he developed and produced with partner Stefan Hatos. Let's Make a Deal aired on NBC daytime from December 30, 1963, to December 27, 1968, and on ABC daytime from December 30, 1968, until July 9, 1976, along with two prime time runs. It aired in syndication from 1971 to 1977, from 1980 to 1981, from 1984 to 1986, and again on NBC briefly from 1990 to 1991, with Hall replacing Bob Hilton, who had been dismissed. He was producer or executive producer of the show through most of its runs. During the show's initial run, Hall appeared alongside model Carol Merrill and announcer Jay Stewart.

In 1969, he guest-starred on season 4, episode 5, of That Girl, playing Dr. Pellman, a dentist.

Besides Let's Make a Deal, the game show Split Second, which originally ran on ABC from 1972 to 1975 with Tom Kennedy as host, and again in syndication in 1986 with Hall hosting that version, was the only other successful program from Hatos-Hall Productions. In 1975, he published his autobiography, co-authored with Bill Libby, called Emcee Monty Hall. Other game shows from Hatos' and Hall's production company included Chain Letter in 1966; a revival of the venerable 1950s-era panel quiz Masquerade Party in 1974; Three for the Money in 1975; It's Anybody's Guess in 1977, which reunited Let's Make a Deal announcer Jay Stewart with Hall, who also hosted the show; and the Canadian-based The Joke's on Us in 1983. Hall filled in as guest host on several daytime game shows while Let's Make a Deal was on NBC, most notably What's This Song? and PDQ.

In 1979, Hall hosted the only game show since Video Village which he did not produce, Goodson-Todman's All-New Beat the Clock. Also, in 1979, Hall made an appearance on the game show Password Plus as a game show contestant, followed by another week of appearances in August 1980 (just prior to the launch of the upcoming Canadian-produced Let's Make a Deal revival, which he took the opportunity to plug). He appeared as himself on "The Promise Ring" episode of That '70s Show in 2001. He played the host of a beauty pageant who schemed to become "the world's most powerful game show host" in the Disney animated series American Dragon: Jake Long. He appeared on GSN Live on March 14, 2008, and hosted a game of Let's Make a Deal for Good Morning America on August 18, 2008, as part of Game Show Reunion week.

In summer 2009, CBS announced that it was reviving Let's Make a Deal on its daytime schedule. The show premiered on October 5, 2009, with Wayne Brady as host. Hall was credited as "Creative Consultant" until his death in 2017, and remains credited as co-creator of the format (with Stefan Hatos), as per many international versions of the show, with Hatos/Hall Productions being credited as co-production company (with Fremantle). Hall made appearances in 2010 and 2013 during the Brady run, and had been part of publicity photos in early 2017 to promote season nine.

Philanthropy
Hall spent much of his post-Deal days involved in philanthropic work. His family says he was always going to telethons and helped raise close to $1 billion for charity in his lifetime. Hall was repeatedly honored for his charitable efforts. Wards at Mount Sinai Hospital in Toronto and Hahnemann University Hospital in Philadelphia are named in his honor.

Honours

Hall received a star on the Hollywood Walk of Fame on August 24, 1973, a Golden Palm Star on the Palm Springs, California, Walk of Stars in 2000, and in 2002, he was inducted into Canada's Walk of Fame.

Hall is one of three game show hosts—along with Alex Trebek and Howie Mandel—on both Hollywood's and Canada's Walks of Fame. In May 1988, Her Excellency, Jeanne Sauvé, the Governor-General of Canada appointed him an Officer of the prestigious The Order of Canada for his humanitarian work in Canada and other nations of the world. In 2003, His Honour the Lieutenant-Governor of Manitoba appointed him a Member of the Order of Manitoba.

He was the recipient of the 2005 Ralph Edwards Service Award from Game Show Congress, in recognition of all the work the emcee-producer has done for charity through the years. On October 13, 2007, Hall was one of the first inductees into the American TV Game Show Hall of Fame in Las Vegas, Nevada. Hall received the Lifetime Achievement Award at the 2013 Daytime Emmy Awards.

Personal life
On September 28, 1947, Hall married Marilyn Doreen Plottel (May 17, 1927 – June 5, 2017); the two had been introduced by a mutual cousin, Norman Shnier, the previous year. They later became United States citizens. They had three children: Tony Award–winning actress Joanna Gleason; Sharon Hall Kessler, president of Endemol Shine Studios; and Richard Hall, an Emmy Award–winning television producer. Monty and Marilyn lived in Beverly Hills, California, from 1962 until their deaths; Marilyn died four months before her husband.

Death
Hall died from heart failure on September 30, 2017, at his home in Beverly Hills a little over a month after his 96th birthday. He was interred at Hillside Memorial Park Cemetery on October 3.

Monty Hall Problem

Hall's name is used in a probability puzzle known as the "Monty Hall problem". The name was conceived by statistician Steve Selvin who used the title in describing a probability problem to Scientific American in 1975 based on one of the games on Let's Make a Deal, and more popularized when it was presented in a weekly national newspaper column by Marilyn vos Savant in 1990.

A host ("Monty") provides a player with three doors, one containing a valuable prize and the other two containing a "gag", valueless prize. The contestant is offered a choice of one of the doors without knowledge of the content behind them. "Monty", who knows which door has the prize, opens a door that the player did not select that has a gag prize, and then offers the player the option to switch from their choice to the other remaining unopened door. The probability problem arises from asking if the player should switch to the unrevealed door.

Mathematically, the problem shows that a player switching to the other door has a 2/3 chance of winning under standard conditions, but this is a counterintuitive effect of switching one's choice of doors, and the problem gained wide attention due to conflicting views following vos Savant's publication, with many asserting that the probability of winning had dropped to 1/2 if one switched. A number of other solutions become possible if the problem setup is outside of the "standard conditions" defined by vos Savant: that the host equally selects one of the two gag prize doors if the player had first picked the winning prize, and the offer to switch is always presented.

Hall gave an explanation of the solution to that problem in an interview with The New York Times reporter John Tierney in 1991. In the article, Hall pointed out that because he had control over the way the game progressed, playing on the psychology of the contestant, the theoretical solution did not apply to the show's actual gameplay. He said he was not surprised at the experts' insistence that the probability was 1 out of 2. "That's the same assumption contestants would make on the show after I showed them there was nothing behind one door," he said. "They'd think the odds on their door had now gone up to 1 in 2, so they hated to give up the door no matter how much money I offered. By opening that door we were applying pressure. We called it the Henry James treatment. It was 'The Turn of the Screw. Hall clarified that as a game show host he was not required to follow the rules of the puzzle as Marilyn vos Savant often explains in her weekly column in Parade, and did not always allow a person the opportunity to switch. For example, he might open their door immediately if it was a losing door, might offer them money to not switch from a losing door to a winning door, or might only allow them the opportunity to switch if they had a winning door. "If the host is required to open a door all the time and offer you a switch, then you should take the switch," he said. "But if he has the choice whether to allow a switch or not, beware. Caveat emptor. It all depends on his mood."

The Monty Hall problem was mentioned in an episode of the first season of the television drama NUMB3RS, in the 2008 movie 21, in the television series Brooklyn Nine-Nine in the episode "Skyfire Chronicle" (season 4 episode 8), and in the novel The Curious Incident of the Dog in the Night-Time. A detailed explanation and rationale for the solution to this problem is presented in the book The World's 200 Hardest Brainteasers by Gary Gruber. In 2011, it was showcased on an episode of the show MythBusters.

References

External links
 
 Monty's Bio at letsmakeadeal.com
 CBC Digital Archives profile of Monty Hall (1970)
 
 

1921 births
2017 deaths
Burials at Hillside Memorial Park Cemetery
Canadian expatriate male actors in the United States
Canadian game show hosts
Canadian male voice actors
Jewish Canadian male actors
Jewish Canadian musicians
Television personalities from New Rochelle, New York
People from Beverly Hills, California
Let's Make a Deal
Male actors from Winnipeg
Musicians from Winnipeg
Members of the Order of Manitoba
National Hockey League broadcasters
Officers of the Order of Canada
People with acquired American citizenship
University of Manitoba alumni
Male actors from New Rochelle, New York
Canadian people of Russian descent
Writers from Winnipeg
Yiddish-speaking people